The 2012 Youngstown State Penguins football team represented Youngstown State University in the 2012 NCAA Division I FCS football season. They were led by third-year head coach Eric Wolford and played their home games at Stambaugh Stadium. They are a member of the Missouri Valley Football Conference. They finished the season 7–4, 4–4 in MVFC play to finish in a tie for sixth place.

Schedule

Source: Schedule

Ranking movements

References

Youngstown State
Youngstown State Penguins football seasons
Youngstown State Penguins football